The Big Ten Conference has been playing baseball since 1896. From 1896 to 1980 the conference champion was determined by the team or teams with the best record. In 1981 the Big Ten Conference baseball tournament was established to decide its champion. The conference also split the 10 schools into two divisions: East and West. In 1988 the conference went back to a single division but still used the tournament to determine the champion. In 1993 the conference returned to using the regular season to name its champion while the team that wins the tournament receives the automatic bid to the NCAA Division I Baseball Championship.

Champions
These are the official Big Ten champions based on standings, the system used from 1896 to 1980 and from 1993 to the present. (From 1981 to 1992, the champion was determined by the conference tournament.)

Championships by school

Italics indicates a team no longer competing in baseball in the Big Ten.

Bold indicates an outright Big Ten championship.

See also
List of Big Ten Conference softball champions

References

Big Ten Baseball Regular Season Standings; Big Ten Conference. June 28, 2018.

Champions
Big Ten Conference